Sir James Philip Duddridge,  (born 26 August 1971) is a British politician and former banker serving as Minister of State for International Trade. He has served as the Member of Parliament (MP) for Rochford and Southend East since 2005. He is a member of the Conservative Party.

Duddridge served under David Cameron as a Lord Commissioner of the Treasury from May 2010 to September 2012 and as Parliamentary Under-Secretary of State for Africa at the Foreign and Commonwealth Office from 2014 to 2016. Following Theresa May’s appointment as Prime Minister in July 2016, he returned to the backbenches. He was appointed by May’s successor, Boris Johnson, as Parliamentary Under-Secretary of State for Exiting the European Union in July 2019, and served in the position until 31 January 2020 when the United Kingdom left the European Union and the office was abolished. Duddridge returned to his former role as Parliamentary Under-Secretary of State for Africa in February 2020 and served in this position until a government reshuffle in September 2021, when he left the government. He later served as a Parliamentary Private Secretary to Johnson from February to July 2022 and as a Lord Commissioner of the Treasury from July 2022 to September 2022.

Early life and career
Duddridge was born on 26 August 1971 in Bristol. He was educated at Crestwood School, Huddersfield High School and The Blue School, Wells. He read Government at the University of Essex.

Duddridge served as Chairman of the Wells Young Conservatives from 1989 until 1991, and was elected Chairman of Essex University's Conservative Association in 1990. In 1991, whilst at university, local Conservative MP Bernard Jenkin appointed him as a researcher.

After graduating in 1993, Duddridge went on to pursue a career in the private sector. He was a banker with Barclays in the City of London and Africa for 10 years, rising to National Sales Director in the Ivory Coast and eventually running the bank's operations in Botswana with a staff of 750 people. He was also a founder member of the polling firm YouGov.

Political career
Duddridge unsuccessfully contested Rother Valley at the 2001 general election for the Conservative Party, finishing second some 14,882 votes behind the sitting Labour MP, Kevin Barron but achieving a 5% swing in his favour. He was subsequently selected as the Conservatives' parliamentary candidate for Rochford and Southend East at the 2005 general election, following Sir Teddy Taylor's retirement. He held the seat for the Conservatives with a majority of 5,494 and delivered his maiden speech in the House of Commons on 9 June 2005.

From 2005 to 2007, Duddridge has served on the Environment, Food and Rural Affairs Select Committee, and the International Development Committee from 2006 to 2008, and in January 2008, he was appointed an Opposition Whip. He was returned at the 2010 general election again as Rochford and Southend East's MP, becoming a Lord Commissioner of the Treasury (Government Whip) with responsibility for the Foreign and Commonwealth Office and the Department for Education, but later left government in Prime Minister David Cameron's September 2012 reshuffle.

On 3 December 2010, Duddridge was permitted to reply on HM Government's behalf from the Despatch Box during an Adjournment debate, a rarity as Commons Whips – particularly Government Whips – by convention do not speak in the Chamber.

Duddridge voted in favour of the Marriage (Same Sex Couples) Bill at both its second reading in February 2013 and its third reading in May 2013.

On 11 August 2014, it was announced that Duddridge would return to Government as Parliamentary Under-Secretary for Foreign and Commonwealth Affairs following the resignation of Mark Simmonds over his claims that he 'could not support his family in London on an MP's salary'.

In September 2014, he claimed £11,348 for accommodation in London on expenses, mostly for hotels, despite already owning two homes in the city. He stated that his claims were in accordance with the Independent Parliamentary Standards authority. The previous year, it was reported that he had the highest expenses claim of local MPs in Essex. He was accused by Sir Ian Kennedy of pursuing a "squalid vendetta" after he helped block the former head of the Commons expenses watchdog from an appointment to a new job of electoral commissioner in January 2018.

Duddridge is seen as highly Eurosceptic, having suggested in 2013 that the Government should tell the European Commissioner to "sod off" rather than pay benefits to Romanians and Bulgarians.

On 9 February 2017, Duddridge tabled an Early Day Motion following comments made by Commons speaker John Bercow on the subject of the pending state visit of US President Donald Trump. The motion proposed "that this House has no confidence in Mr Speaker", and received criticism from across the house. The bid to remove Bercow as Commons Speaker failed after just five MPs backed Duddridge's motion of no confidence.

In the House of Commons he sits on the High Speed Rail (West Midlands - Crewe) Bill Select Committee (Commons) and has sat on the Regulatory Reform Committee, the Procedure Committee and the International Development Sub-Committee on the Work of the Independent Commission for Aid Impact.

On 27 September 2017, The Times reported that Duddridge, who had been Parliamentary Under-Secretary of State for Africa until 2016, was being paid £3,300 for eight hours' work a month as a consultant for Brand Communications on top of his MP's salary. The newspaper reported that this had led to renewed calls to review the rules surrounding jobs for former members of government. It was reported that he was working for Brand Communications and that the company was one of a handful that had not agreed to the industry's code of conduct that bans hiring sitting MPs. Duddridge told The Times: "The work I do involves helping companies going into the African marketplace re-brand themselves. It is not a public affairs role."

On 27 July 2019, he was appointed Parliamentary Under-Secretary of State for Exiting the European Union in Boris Johnson's administration.

On 4 July 2021, he attended the funeral of Kenneth Kaunda as Parliamentary Under-Secretary of State for Africa, and incorrectly identified Kaunda as Zimbabwean rather than Zambian.

On 6 July 2022, and following the mass resignation of members of the Johnson government, he was involved in an on-air argument with Piers Morgan during an appearance on an edition of talkTV's Piers Morgan Uncensored when he refused to answer questions from Morgan. Duddridge had been sent out from 10 Downing Street to speak in defence of Prime Minister Boris Johnson, but while he said he was happy to speak to the channel's political editor, Kate McCann, he refused to take questions from Morgan, claiming his wife would divorce him if he did. This resulted in the presenter labelling him an "impertinent little twerp", with Morgan later describing the moment as his "favourite TV encounter ever".

On 8 July 2022, he was appointed Lord Commissioner of the Treasury, succeeding Michael Tomlinson.

He endorsed Liz Truss in the July–September 2022 Conservative Party leadership election.

Duddridge was appointed a Knight Commander of the Order of St Michael and St George (KCMG) in the 2022 Special Honours.

Personal life
Duddrige is married with 3 children.

References

External links

James Duddridge MP's official website

Debrett's People of Today
Guardian Unlimited Politics – Ask Aristotle: James Duddridge MP
BBC: meet the MP
BBC Politics webpage 

1971 births
Living people
People educated at Huddersfield New College
Alumni of the University of Essex
Conservative Party (UK) MPs for English constituencies
UK MPs 2005–2010
UK MPs 2010–2015
UK MPs 2015–2017
UK MPs 2017–2019
UK MPs 2019–present
Politicians awarded knighthoods
Knights Commander of the Order of St Michael and St George
Government ministers of the United Kingdom
Parliamentary Private Secretaries to the Prime Minister
Politicians from Bristol
People from Southend-on-Sea